Albino Mamede Cleto (March 3, 1935 – June 15, 2012) was the Roman Catholic bishop of the Roman Catholic Diocese of Coimbra, Portugal.

Ordained in 1959, Mamede Cleto was named bishop in 1982 and retired in 2011.

Notes

20th-century Roman Catholic bishops in Portugal
1935 births
2012 deaths
21st-century Roman Catholic bishops in Portugal